The Pulau School is the only school on the Pitcairn Islands. It is located in the capital of Adamstown and follows a modified version of the New Zealand educational curriculum, but with some changes made to promote local culture and traditions. The school acts as a primary school and caters to children from 5–14 years of age. Upper secondary education is usually completed at a boarding school in New Zealand.

The students are taught by a visiting instructor who typically teaches on the island for a term of one year. The teacher is also considered the principal and is responsible not only for teaching, but developing the curriculum and promoting continuing education among the rest of the island's population.

History 
The school traces its origin back to the simple curriculum taught by then magistrate Simon Young and his wife beginning in 1864. After a period of management by the Seventh-Day Adventist Church, the British government assumed responsibility for the school in 1958. In 2004 the school was remodeled and includes a modern classroom, computer lab and library.

There were ten students in 1999; enrollment was previously 20 in the early 1950s, 28 in 1959, and 36 in 1962. The Pulau School has a residence for teachers built in 2004; there was a previous such facility built in 1950.

References 

Pitcairn Islands
Adamstown, Pitcairn Islands
Schools in British Overseas Territories